Some of the colonies, protectorates and mandates of the French Colonial Empire used distinctive colonial flags.  These most commonly had a French Tricolour in the canton.

As well as the flags of individual colonies, the governors-general of French colonies flew a square flag with a blue field and the French ensign in the canton. This flag was flown beneath the national ensign. Colonial governors used a rectangular swallow-tailed version of this flag.

Colonial flags with a tricolour canton
The flags with the French flag in the canton, which on many occasions were already existing flags without the tricolour, resembled the British colonial flags, which originated as defacements of the British ensigns, which have the British Union Jack in the canton, and a red, white or blue fly. Naval sources show flags such as those used in the French Mandate of Syria as having the tricolour with unequal stripes, as in the French ensign, but it is likely that these versions of the flags were used at sea, and on land the tricolour had the standard equal stripes.

While for the sake of simplicity French colonial ensign are on this page classified by appearance, this should not be taken to imply common origins or the existence of undefaced ensigns used by the French government unless otherwise noted.

Red field

 Laos, French Indochina: Laos was part of French Indochina from 1893. The tricolour was added to the flag of the Kingdom of Luang Prabang, which was red with a white image of a three headed elephant on a stand with a parasol.
 Morocco: The Protectorate of Morocco from 1919 to 1953, used the national flag with a tricolour in the canton as a civil ensign.
 Tunisia: From 1881–1956, Tunisia was a French protectorate. It has been reported that the tricolour was added to the Tunisian flag for use as a civil ensign, as in Morocco, but it seems that such a flag was never official.
 Wallis and Futuna: The unofficial, but commonly used flag of Wallis and Futuna is red with four white triangles arranged in a square and the tricolour in the canton with a white fimbriation.

Blue field
 Damascus: This part of the French Mandate of Syria from 1922–25 used a blue flag with a white disk in the centre and the tricolour in the canton.
 Syria (1920): The French Mandate of Syria may have originally used a sky blue flag with a white crescent and star and French tricolour in the canton.
 In 1939, the governor-general's flag, was a square blue flag with a French ensign in the canton. With a swallow-tail, this flag was the colonial governors' flag.

White field

 Aleppo: This part of the French Mandate of Syria from 1920–25 used a white flag with tricolour in the canton and three yellow five-pointed stars in a triangle in the fly.
 Latakia: This part of the French Mandate of Syria used a white flag, ratio 2:3, with the tricolour in the canton taking up 1/9 of the area of the flag, red triangles in the other three corners, and a golden sunburst in the centre of the flag.
The first banner of the French Revolution had a white field with a tricolour in the canton, although the order of the colours has since been reversed.

Green field
 Togo: The flag used in 1957–8 had two white five-pointed stars in the green field, one at the lower left-hand corner, the other in the upper right-hand corner.

Yellow field

 Annam, part of the Union of French Indochina from 1886 until 1954, used a flag with a plain yellow background, in two shapes one with the ratio 2:3 and the other 1:1 (square).

Multicolour field
 Jebel Druze. From 1924 until 1936, this part of the French Mandate of Syria had a flag with a white vertical strip beneath the tricolour in the canton, with the rest of the flag made up of green, red, yellow, blue and white horizontal stripes.
 Syria: In 1922, the French Mandate was made a federation, with a federal flag made up of green-white-green horizontal stripes and the tricolour in the canton. This flag was also used when Aleppo and Damascus merged.

Colonial flags with other designs

Modified tricolours
Lebanon: The French Mandate of Greater Lebanon (1920–43) used as a flag the French tricolour with a green cedar in the middle stripe.

Other designs
French Polynesia: The flag of French Polynesia has the horizontal stripes, red-white-red. The white stripe is twice the height of each red stripe, and contains an emblem consisting of a boat, the sun, and waves.

Galleries

Historical flags

Flags with French history

Current official and unofficial flags of French overseas regions, collectivities, and territories

Current subnational flags of overseas collectivities and territories

Other official flags

See also
French colonial empires
List of French flags
List of French possessions and colonies

References

 F.E. Hulme, The Flags of the World: Their History, Blazonry, and Associations, From the Banner of the Crusader to the Burgee of the Yachtsman; Flags National, Colonial, Personal; The Ensigns of Mighty Empires; the Symbols of Lost Causes (Colonial Edition), Frederick Wayne and Co., London, pp. 152, (1895).
 W.J. Gordon, Flags of the World Past and Present: Their Story and Associations, Frederick Wayne and Co., Ltd., London, pp. 265, (1929).
 B. McCandless, and G. Grosvenor, "Our Flag Number", The National Geographic Magazine, National Geographic Society, Washington, D.C., Vol. XXXII, No. 4, pp. 420, October, (1917).
 G. Grosvenor, and W.J. Showalter, "Flags of the World", The National Geographic Magazine, National Geographic Society, Washington, D.C., Vol. LXVI, No. 3, pp. 338–396, September, (1934).
 Flags of All Nations Volume I. National Flags and Ensigns (B.R.20(1) 1955), Her Majesty's Stationery Office, London, (1955).
 Flags of All Nations Volume II. Standards of Rulers, Sovereigns and Heads of State; Flags of Heads of Ministries, and of Naval, Military, and Air Force Officers (B.R.20(2) 1958), Her Majesty's Stationery Office, London, (1958).
 Flags of All Nations Change Five (BR20), Her Majesty's Stationery Office, London, (1989), Revision (1999).
 W. Smith, Flags Through the Ages and Across the World, McGraw-Hill Book Co., Ltd., Maidenhead, England, pp. 361, (1975).
 J.W. Norie, and J.S. Hobbs, Three Hundred and Six Illustrations of the Maritime Flags of All Nations; Arranged Geographically, with Enlarged Standards: Together with Regulations and Instructions Relating to British Flags &c., Printed for, and Published by C. Wilson, At the Navigation Warehouse and Naval Academy, No. 157, Leadenhall Street, Near Cornhill,(Facsimile reprint of 1848 original), (1987).
 Ottfried Neubecker, Flaggenbuch (Flg.B.). Bearbeitet und herausgegeben vom Oberkommando der Kriegsmarine. Abgesclossen am 1. December 1939, (Historical Facsimile edition containing all national and international flags 1939-1945), pp. 193, (1992).

Colonial flags
Former French colonies
French colonial empire